Brandon Willis Barnes (born November 16, 1994) is an American professional soccer player who currently plays as a goalkeeper for Chicago House AC in the National Independent Soccer Association.

Career

Early career 
Barnes played college soccer at Seton Hall University between 2013 and 2016, but only saw any minutes with the team during their 2015 season. Barnes transferred to Bradley University in 2017, where he made 21 appearances for the Braves. In his 21 appearances for the Braves, Barnes broke multiple school records as well as topped the NCAA Division 1 ranking charts. In his one-season Barnes achieved the following rankings: total saves (3rd, 103); save percentage (8th, .851); goalie minutes played (13th, 1967); saves per game (15th, 4.90); and shutouts (T17th, 9.5) ... First player in program history to be selected MVC Player of the Week, Offensive or Defensive, four times during a season ... His 9.5 shutouts and .851 saves percentage both ranked as the second-best single-season marks in program history.

Jersey Express
While in college, he spent the 2016 PDL season with the Jersey Express. There, he made three appearances.

Laredo Heat
In 2018, Barnes played in the National Premier Soccer League for the  Laredo Heat. During his time at Laredo Barnes helped lead the team to a 10-0-0 record in the Lone Star Conference. Additionally, he helped Laredo secure the post season championship with a 12-0-0 record.

Richmond Kickers
Barnes signed with Richmond Kickers of the United Soccer League on August 3, 2018.

Forward Madison
Barnes signed with Forward Madison FC of USL League One on April 2, 2019.

References

External links 
 
 

1994 births
Living people
American soccer players
Association football goalkeepers
Bradley Braves men's soccer players
Jersey Express players
Laredo Heat players
People from Cary, Illinois
Richmond Kickers players
Seton Hall Pirates men's soccer players
Soccer players from Illinois
Sportspeople from the Chicago metropolitan area
USL Championship players
USL League Two players
Forward Madison FC players